Damián Ísmodes Saravia (born 10 March 1989) is a Peruvian footballer who plays for Carlos Stein as a midfielder.

Club career
Ísmodes was born in Lima. After just two years of professional football, playing with hometown's Sporting Cristal, he signed in the 2008 January transfer window with La Liga club Racing de Santander, appearing in one match, the 1–1 away draw against CA Osasuna on 18 May 2008 ; after receiving very little playing time, however, he was loaned by the Cantabrians one year later, joining second division side SD Eibar until the end of the campaign.

In August 2009, after the start to his Spanish career – only four league appearances in two seasons combined, and relegation with Eibar– Ísmodes was loaned to former team Sporting Cristal until the end of 2010, returning home. He stayed in the country afterwards, this time loaned to Universitario de Deportes for one year.

Released on 30 June 2011, Ísmodes returned to his country and went on to represent several clubs in the Primera División.

International career
A full Peruvian international since the age of 18, Ísmodes was selected for the final squad at 2007 Copa América, where he appeared once.

References

External links
 
 
 

1989 births
Living people
Footballers from Lima
Peruvian footballers
Association football midfielders
Sporting Cristal footballers
Club Universitario de Deportes footballers
Cienciano footballers
León de Huánuco footballers
Deportivo Municipal footballers
Sport Boys footballers
Real Garcilaso footballers
Racing de Santander players
SD Eibar footballers
La Liga players
Segunda División players
Peruvian Primera División players
Peru international footballers
2007 Copa América players
Peruvian expatriate footballers
Expatriate footballers in Spain
Peruvian expatriate sportspeople in Spain